Edmundo Domínguez Aragonés (27 November 1938 - 12 September 2014)

Aragonés was born in Argentona, Spain, on 27 November 1938. When he was nine months old, he came with his family to Puerto de Veracruz from a concentration camp in France.

Aragonés was naturalised as a Mexican citizen in 1958. He studied arts at the University of Guadalajara. He was director general of the Mexican Editorial Organisation, deputy director of supervision and operation of the Research and Evaluation Department in RTC, Notimex contributor, political information director-editor at Entrelíneas, founding director of Cultural Opinion (with Horacho Enrique Nansen), founder of La Calle (with José Barrera Ortiz), founder of IPN Science, Arts: Culture, deputy director of El Gallo Ilustrado, director of the editorial section of El Sol de Mexico.

He died of a severe case of pneumonia in the federal district of Mexico City on the night of 12 September 2014. He was a chronicler, journalist, essayist, novelist and a poet.

Mexican editors
1938 births
2014 deaths
Spanish emigrants to Mexico
University of Guadalajara alumni